Megan Charpentier (born May 26, 2001) is a Canadian actress, best known for her roles as the feral child Victoria in the horror film Mama (2013), as the Red Queen in Resident Evil: Retribution (2012), and for her role as Gretta Keene in It (2017) and the sequel It Chapter Two (2019).

Early life
Charpentier has two younger sisters, Madison and Genea Charpentier. Her parents are Anne and Maurice Charpentier.

Career
Charpentier began her acting career as a three-year-old appearing in a Hasbro commercial after being offered to audition. Since then she has made several guest appearances in several TV shows most notably in Supernatural as Tess McAnn and she has also been in several TV movies. She is often associated with Amanda Seyfried and has played the younger version of the actress' character twice, once in Jennifer's Body and again in Red Riding Hood. Charpentier appeared in Resident Evil: Retribution as the Red Queen and in Mama as Victoria.

She was nominated for Best Newcomer at the UBCP/ACTRA Awards for her role in Mama.

Filmography

Film

Television

Accolades

References

External links

Canadian child actresses
Canadian film actresses
Canadian television actresses
Living people
2001 births